The Governor-General of the Philippines (Spanish: Gobernador y Capitán General de Filipinas; Filipino: Gobernador-Heneral ng Pilipinas/Kapitan Heneral ng Pilipinas;) was the title of the government executive during the colonial period of the Philippines, governed by Mexico City and Madrid (1565–1898) and the United States (1898–1946), and briefly by Great Britain (1762–1764) and Japan (1942–1945). They were also the representative of the executive of the ruling power.

On November 15, 1935, the Commonwealth of the Philippines was established as a transitional government to prepare the country for independence from American control. The governor-general was replaced by an elected Filipino president of the Philippine Commonwealth, as the chief executive of the Philippines, taking over many of the duties of the governor-general. The former American governor-general then became known as the high commissioner to the Philippines.

From 1565 to 1898, the Philippines was under Spanish rule. From 1565 to 1821, the governor and captain-general was appointed by the Viceroy of New Spain upon recommendation of the Spanish Cortes and governed on behalf of the monarch of Spain to govern the Captaincy General of the Philippines. When there was a vacancy (e.g. death, or during the transitional period between governors), the Real Audiencia in Manila appoints a temporary governor from among its members.

After Mexico won its independence in 1821, the country was no longer under the Viceroyalty of New Spain (present-day Mexico) and administrative affairs formerly handled by New Spain were transferred to Madrid and placed directly under the Spanish Crown.

Under New Spain (1565–1764)

British occupation of Manila (1761–1764) 
After the Spanish defeat at the Battle of Manila in 1762, the Philippines was shortly governed simultaneously by two Governors-General of the Spanish Empire and the British Empire.

Great Britain shortly occupied Manila and the naval port of Cavite as part of the Seven Years' War, while the Spanish Governor-General set up a provisional government in Bacolor, Pampanga to continue administering the rest of the archipelago.

British governor-general

Spanish governor-general

Under New Spain (1764–1821) 
After the British returned Manila to the Spanish in 1764, the Spanish Governor-General Francisco Javier de la Torre resumed administration of the Philippines under the authority of the Viceroy of New Spain in modern-day Mexico (New Spain) as part of the Spanish Empire.

The Philippines, along with the rest of the Spanish Empire, became part of the First French Empire in 1808 after Napoleon overthrew Ferdinand VII and installed Joseph Bonaparte as king until his abdication in 1813, as part of a disastrous consequence of Napoleon's 1812 Russian canpaign, the Peninsular Wars, particularly the Battle of Vitoria, and of forming the Sixth Coalition.

Direct Spanish control (1821–1898)  
After the 1821 Mexican War of Independence, Mexico became independent and was no longer part of the Spanish Empire. The Viceroyalty of New Spain ceased to exist. The Philippines, as a result, was directly governed from Madrid, under the Spanish Crown.

United States Military Government (1898–1902) 

The city of Manila was captured by American expeditionary forces on August 13, 1898. On August 14, 1898, the terms of the Spanish capitulation were signed. From this date, American government in the Philippines begins. General Wesley Merritt, in accordance with the instructions of the United States President, issued a proclamation announcing the establishment of United States military rule.

During the transition period, executive authority in all civil affairs in the Philippine government was exercised by the military governor.

Insular Government (1901–1935) 

On July 4, 1901, executive authority over the islands was transferred to the president of the Second Philippine Commission who had the title of Civil Governor, a position appointed by the President of the United States and approved by the United States Senate. For the first year, a Military Governor, Adna Chaffee, ruled parts of the country still resisting the American rule, concurrent with Civil Governor, William Howard Taft. Disagreements between the two were not uncommon. The following year, on July 4, 1902, Taft became the sole executive authority. Chaffee remained commander of the Philippine Division until September 30, 1902.

After his retirement as Civil Governor, Governor Taft was appointed Secretary of War and he secured for his successor the adoption by Congress of the title Governor-General of the Philippine Islands thereby "reviving the high designation used during the last period of Spanish rule and placing the office on a parity of dignity with that of other colonial empires of first importance". The term "insular" (from insula, the Latin word for island) refers to U.S. island territories that are not incorporated into either a state or a federal district. All insular areas were under the authority of the U.S. Bureau of Insular Affairs, a division of the US War Department.

High Commissioner to the Philippines (1935–42 and 1945–46) 

On November 15, 1935, the Commonwealth of the Philippines was inaugurated as a transitional government to prepare the country for independence. The office of President of the Philippine Commonwealth replaced the Governor-General as the country's chief executive. The Governor-General became the High Commissioner of the Philippines with Frank Murphy, the last governor-general, as the first high commissioner. The High Commissioner exercised no executive power but rather represented the colonial power, the United States Government, in the Philippines. The high commissioner moved from Malacañang Palace to the newly built High Commissioner's Residence, now the Embassy of the United States in Manila.

After the Philippine independence on July 4, 1946, the last High Commissioner, Paul McNutt, became the first United States Ambassador to the Philippines.

Japanese military governors (1942–1945) 
In December 1941, the Commonwealth of the Philippines was invaded by Japan as part of World War II. The next year, the Empire of Japan sent a military governor to control the country during wartime, followed by the formal establishment of the puppet second republic.

On September 2, 1945, the position of Governor-General of the Philippines was abolished. The Philippines' independence from the United States was proclaimed on July 4, 1946, installing Manuel Roxas as the fifth President of the Philippines and ushering in the Third Philippine Republic.

Vice-governors of the Philippines 
On October 29, 1901, the position of Vice-Governor was created. The Vice-Governor was appointed by the President of the United States to act as the Governor-General (known at that time as the Civil Governor) in case of illness or temporary absence.

Timelines

1750–1800

1800–1850

1850–1898

1898–1946

See also 

Filipino styles and honorifics
List of sovereign state leaders in the Philippines
 List of recorded datu in the Philippines
 President of the Philippines
 List of presidents of the Philippines
 Audiencia
 List of Viceroys of New Spain
 Spanish Empire
 History of the Philippines
 Military History of the Philippines
 United States Territory
 Governor-General
 Lists of office-holders
 Gobernadorcillo

Notes

References 
Governors of the Philippines

 01
Captaincy General of the Philippines
Insular Government of the Philippine Islands

Philippine Heads of State and Government
Political office-holders in the Philippines
People of American colonial Philippines
1565 establishments in the Philippines